This is a list of episodes for Kamen Rider Geats, a Japanese tokusatsu television drama. It is the fourth series in the franchise released in Japan's Reiwa Era and the 33rd entry of Toei's long-running Kamen Rider series produced by TV Asahi. The episodes are divided into arcs that correspond to an individual Desire Grand Prix (DGP) tournament.

Episodes

References

Geats
Kamen Rider Geats